Denis Bond may refer to:
 Denis Bond (writer) (born 1946), British children's author
 Denis Bond (President of the Council) (died 1658), English politician who was a member and later president of Cromwell's Council of State
 Denis Bond (MP) (1676–1747), English Member of Parliament for Corfe Castle, Dorchester and Poole

See also
 Dennis Bond, (born 1947), English footballer